Eli Templeton is a former professional Australian rules footballer who played for the St Kilda Football Club in the Australian Football League (AFL). Templeton was recruited from the Burnie Dockers with the third pick in the 2013 AFL Rookie Draft.

Templeton made his debut in Round 1 of the 2014 AFL season against Melbourne. At the conclusion of the 2016 season, he was delisted by St Kilda.

His cousin is Australian Paralympic swimmer, Jacob Templeton.

Templeton plays for Port Melbourne in the Victorian Football League.

References

External links 

1995 births
Living people
St Kilda Football Club players
Burnie Dockers Football Club players
Australian rules footballers from Tasmania
Sandringham Football Club players
Port Melbourne Football Club players